Edmund Akanya is an Anglican bishop in Nigeria: formerly the Archbishop of Kaduna,  he is the current Bishop of Kebbi.

He was elected Archbishop of Kaduna Province for a second term on 19 January 2013.

Notes

Living people
1967 births
Anglican archbishops of Kaduna
Anglican bishops of Kaduna
21st-century Anglican bishops in Nigeria
Anglican bishops of Kebbi